Vladimir Aleksandrovich Steklov (born 3 March 1948) is a Soviet and Russian actor.

Biography
He graduated from the Astrakhan School of Theatre in 1970 and acted in more than 50 movies during his career.  In 1999 he underwent basic cosmonaut training in preparation for visiting the MIR space station as a commercial guest to work on a film, but his trip was canceled.

Steklov has two children;  one (Agrippina  Steklova, born 1973) from his first marriage (to  Lyudmila   Moshchenskaya) and one (Glafira  Steklova born 1997) by his current wife, Olga  Semlyanova.

Selected filmography
 Dead Souls (Мёртвые души, 1984) as Petrushka
 Wild Pigeon (Чужая белая и рябой, 1986) as Kolya the "Gypsy"
 Plumbum, or The Dangerous Game (Плюмбум, или опасная игра, 1987) as Lopatov
 The Prisoner of Château d'If (Узник замка Иф, 1988) as Bertuccio
 Gardemarines ahead! (Гардемарины, вперёд!, 1988) as Gusev
 My Best Friend, General Vasili, Son of Joseph Stalin (Мой лучший друг генерал Василий, сын Иосифа, 1991) as Vasili Josifovich Stalin
 The Inner Circle (1991) as Khrustalyev
 The Master and Margarita (Мастер и Маргарита, 1994) as Azazello
 Tycoon (Олигарх, 2002) as Belyenkiy
 Konservy (Консервы, 2007)
 Yeltsin: Three Days in August (Ельцин. Три дня в августе, 2011) as Pavel Sergeevich Grachov
 Gagarin: First in Space (Гагарин. Первый в космосе, 2013) as Nikolai Kamanin
 Molodezhka (Молодёжка, 2013-2017) as Ilya Romanovich Pakhomov
 Anyone but Them (Только не Они, 2018) as Mayor
 The One (2022 film) as Knyazev's supervisor

References

External links

1949 births
Living people
Soviet male film actors
Soviet male television actors
Soviet male stage actors
Russian male film actors
Russian male television actors
Russian male stage actors
20th-century Russian male actors
21st-century Russian male actors
People's Artists of Russia